Atul Kulkarni (born 10 September 1965) is an Indian actor, producer and screenwriter who works in Hindi, Marathi, Kannada, Malayalam, Tamil, English, Odia and Telugu language films. Kulkarni won the National Award for the Best Supporting Actor for the films Hey Ram and Chandni Bar. He is also the president of Quest, a research-action organization concentrating on enhancing quality of education. He left his study in engineering at College of Engineering, Pune while he was in his first year. He is known for his performances in films like Hey Ram, Chandni Bar, Rang De Basanti (2006), Natarang (2010) among others. He has written the screenplay of Aamir Khan's movie Laal Singh Chadda. which is the official remake of Forrest Gump.

Early life and career
Kulkarni received his diploma in acting from the National School of Drama, New Delhi in 1995. He is married to theater actress Geetanjali Kulkarni, whom he met at the National School of Drama.

Kulkarni's first stint on stage was during his high school days. He participated in the Maharashtra State Drama Competition regularly. Between 1989 and 1992, he won awards for Acting and also for Drama-Direction. Atul enacted in Gandhi Viruddh Gandhi, the play made later famous by Dilip Prabhavalkar in Marathi professional theatre circuit until mid-90s. Later during his college days he actively participated in cultural gatherings. While studying, Atul joined Natya Aradhana, an amateur theatre group from Solapur. Atul Kulkarni holds a postgraduate diploma in dramatic arts from National School of Drama, New Delhi. 
Atul Kulkarni, a national-award winner and a fine actor, expresses his belief of art being a product of social, political and economic changes in the society.

Other works

Philanthropy
Kulkarni has been serving as President of Quest Education Support Trust. Quest Trust invests in running workshops and enabling Teachers, to support education for children of marginalized communities between 3–14 years. All this activity is mainly in State of Maharashtra. It conducts its activities in Marathi language.

Atul Kulkarni has been active in sharing his knowledge on running NGO with other NGO's. He does visit Maharashtra based NGO's like Snehalaya regularly.  Kulkarni has been involved in an environmental project, making a 24-acre barren land in Satara District into Green area.

Filmography

Films

Television/web series

Awards and nominations

National Film Awards

Filmfare Awards
 2001: Nominated: Best Supporting Actor for Hey Ram
 2012: Won : Best Supporting Actor – Kannada for Edegarike

 Asia Pacific Screen Awards
 2010: Nominated: Best Performance by an Actor for Natarang

 VIFF Vienna Independent Film Festival
 2019: Won: Best Actor in Murder on the Road to Kathmandu

References

External links

 

1965 births
Living people
Male actors from Karnataka
Male actors in Kannada cinema
Male actors in Marathi cinema
Male actors in Hindi cinema
Male actors in Malayalam cinema
Indian male film actors
People from Belgaum
Best Supporting Actor National Film Award winners
Filmfare Awards South winners
National School of Drama alumni
20th-century Indian male actors
21st-century Indian male actors